Nico Emonds (born 4 April 1961) is a Belgian former professional racing cyclist. He rode in five editions of the Tour de France, four editions of the Vuelta a España and two editions of the Giro d'Italia.

References

External links

1961 births
Living people
Belgian male cyclists
Sportspeople from Hasselt
Cyclists from Limburg (Belgium)